1556 Wingolfia, provisional designation , is a metallic asteroid from the outer regions of the asteroid belt, approximately 30 kilometers in diameter. It was discovered by German astronomer Karl Reinmuth at the Heidelberg-Königstuhl State Observatory on 14 January 1942. The asteroid was named after Wingolf, a student fraternity in Heidelberg.

Orbit and classification 

Wingolfia is a non-family asteroid from the background population of the asteroids belt. It orbits the Sun in the outer main belt at a distance of 3.1–3.8 AU once every 6 years and 4 months (2,316 days). Its orbit has an eccentricity of 0.11 and an inclination of 16° with respect to the ecliptic. The body's observation arc begins at Heidelberg with its official discovery observation in January 1942.

Physical characteristics 

In the Tholen classification, Wingolfia has an ambiguous spectral type, similar to the X-types (which includes the M-type asteroids) with some resemblance to the carbonaceous C-types. It has also been characterized as an M- and X-type, by direct photometric observations and by PanSTARRS photometric survey, respectively. The Lightcurve Data Base adopts an M-type.

Rotation period 

In October 1990, a rotational lightcurve of Wingolfia was obtained from photometric observations by Italian astronomers at ESO's La Silla Observatory using the ESO 1-metre telescope. Lightcurve analysis gave a rotation period of 10 hours with a brightness variation of 0.15 magnitude.

Diameter and albedo 

According to the surveys carried out by the Infrared Astronomical Satellite IRAS and the Japanese Akari satellite, Wingolfia measures 28.65 and 33.88 kilometers in diameter and its surface has an albedo of 0.093 and 0.1297, respectively. The Collaborative Asteroid Lightcurve Link adopts the results obtained by IRAS. All diameter measurements are based on an absolute magnitude of 10.55.

Naming 

This minor planet was named by the discoverer after Wingolf, which is one of Germany's long-standing Christian student fraternity in Heidelberg, that was prohibited during Nazi Germany, and reinstalled after WWII. The official  was published by the Minor Planet Center in May 1955. The asteroid's name was announced on 17 June 1955, during the celebration of the fraternity's 104th anniversary. The discoverer's original citation reads:

References

External links 
Wingolf student fraternity , homepage of the Heidelberger Studentenverbindung 
 Asteroid Lightcurve Database (LCDB), query form (info )
 Dictionary of Minor Planet Names, Google books
 Asteroids and comets rotation curves, CdR – Observatoire de Genève, Raoul Behrend
 Discovery Circumstances: Numbered Minor Planets (1)-(5000) – Minor Planet Center
 
 

001556
Discoveries by Karl Wilhelm Reinmuth
Named minor planets
001556
19420114